The 2027 North Rhine-Westphalia state election will be held in 2027 to elect the 19th Landtag of North Rhine-Westphalia.

Opinion polls

References

See also 

Elections in North Rhine-Westphalia
2027 elections in Germany